James Sheekey (born 10 September 1994) is a Welsh rugby union player who plays as a Flanker or Number 8. He was a Wales under-20 international.

Sheekey made his debut for the Dragons regional team in 2017 having previously played for Cardiff Blues and Cardiff RFC. He was released by the Dragons at the end of the 2019-20 season.

References

External links 
Dragons profile

Welsh rugby union players
Dragons RFC players
Living people
1994 births
Cardiff RFC players
Cardiff Rugby players
Rugby union flankers
Rugby union number eights